Christian Bom (born 25 August 1988) is a footballer who plays as a goalkeeper for FC Ouest Tourangeau in the French DHR.

Born in Cameroon, he was a member, as a naturalized citizen, of the Equatorial Guinea national team.

External links
Facebook

 

1988 births
Living people
Association football goalkeepers
Cameroonian footballers
Footballers from Douala
Panthère du Ndé players
Cameroonian expatriate footballers
Cameroonian expatriate sportspeople in France
Expatriate footballers in France
Cameroonian emigrants to Equatorial Guinea
Naturalized citizens of Equatorial Guinea
Equatoguinean footballers
Equatorial Guinea international footballers
Equatorial Guinea youth international footballers
Equatoguinean people of Cameroonian descent
Akonangui FC players
Deportivo Mongomo players